Ramsås is a village in Härnösand Municipality, Sweden.

References 

Populated places in Härnösand Municipality
Ångermanland